Libo Airport  is an airport serving Libo County, Guizhou Province, China.  It is also called Qiannan Airport because of its location in the Qiannan Buyei and Miao Autonomous Prefecture.  Construction for the airport started in July 2003 and was completed in September 2007 at a total cost of 390 million yuan.  However, since its opening the airport has been plagued by the lack of flights and passengers, handling only 151 passengers in all of 2009.

Airlines and destinations

See also
List of airports in China
List of the busiest airports in China

References

Airports in Guizhou
Airports established in 2007
2007 establishments in China
Qiannan Buyei and Miao Autonomous Prefecture